Jiske Griffioen and Aniek van Koot defeated Sabine Ellerbrock and Sharon Walraven in the final, 6–2, 6–3 to win the women's doubles wheelchair tennis title at the 2013 French Open. It was their second step towards an eventual Grand Slam.

Marjolein Buis and Esther Vergeer were the reigning champions, but Vergeer retired from professional wheelchair tennis in February 2013. Buis partnered Lucy Shuker, but was defeated in the semifinals by Ellebrock and Walraven.

Seeds
 Jiske Griffioen /  Aniek van Koot (champions)
 Marjolein Buis /  Lucy Shuker (semifinals)

Draw

Finals

References
 Draw

Wheelchair Women's Doubles
French Open, 2013 Women's Doubles